The List for Sandžak (Bosnian/Serbian: Lista za Sandžak / Листа за Санџак) was a minority coalition, representing ethnic Bosniaks in Serbia. It was led by Sulejman Ugljanin and included:
 Party of Democratic Action of Sandžak
 Bosniak Democratic Party of Sandžak
 Social Liberal Party of Sandžak
At the legislative election in 2007, it has won two seats in the parliament.

Political party alliances in Serbia
Bosniak political parties in Serbia